Saham also spelled as Seham is a village in Nakodar in Jalandhar district of Punjab State, India. The village is administrated by a sarpanch who is an elected representative of village as per Panchayati raj (India).

Transport 
Nakodar railway station is the nearest train station.

References 

Villages in Jalandhar district